Eupithecia karapinensis is a moth in the  family Geometridae. It is found in Taiwan.

References

Moths described in 1917
karapinensis
Moths of Asia